In mathematics, a Hilbert modular surface or Hilbert–Blumenthal surface is an algebraic surface obtained by taking a quotient of a product of two copies of the upper half-plane by a Hilbert modular group. More generally, a Hilbert modular variety is an algebraic variety obtained by taking a quotient of a product of multiple copies of the upper half-plane by a Hilbert modular group.

Hilbert modular surfaces were first described by   using some unpublished notes written by David Hilbert about 10 years before.

Definitions
If R is the ring of integers of a real quadratic field, then 
the Hilbert modular group SL2(R) acts on the product H×H of two copies of the upper half plane H.
There are several birationally equivalent surfaces related to this action, any of which may be called Hilbert modular surfaces:
The surface X is the quotient of H×H by SL2(R); it is not compact and usually has quotient singularities coming from points with non-trivial isotropy groups. 
The surface X* is obtained from X by adding a finite number of points corresponding to the cusps of the action. It is compact, and has not only the quotient singularities of X, but also singularities at its cusps. 
The surface Y is obtained from X* by resolving the singularities in a minimal way. It is a compact smooth algebraic surface, but is not in general minimal. 
The surface Y0 is obtained from Y by blowing down certain exceptional −1-curves. It is smooth and compact, and is often (but not always) minimal.

There are several variations of this construction:
The Hilbert modular group may be replaced by some subgroup of finite index, such as a congruence subgroup. 
One can extend the Hilbert modular group by a group of order 2, acting on the Hilbert modular group via the Galois action, and exchanging the two copies of the upper half plane.

Singularities
 showed how to resolve the quotient singularities, and  showed how to  resolve their cusp singularities.

Classification of surfaces
The papers  ,  and  identified their type in the classification of algebraic surfaces. Most of them are surfaces of general type, but several are rational surfaces or blown up K3 surfaces or elliptic surfaces.

Examples
 gives a long table of examples.

The Clebsch surface blown up at its 10 Eckardt points is a Hilbert modular surface.

Associated to a quadratic field extension 
Given a quadratic field extension  for  there is an associated Hilbert modular variety  obtained from compactifying a certain quotient variety  and resolving its singularities. Resolving its singularities gives the variety  called the Hilbert modular variety of the field extension. From the Bailey-Borel compactification theorem, there is an embedding of this surface into a projective space.

See also

 Hilbert modular form
 Picard modular surface
 Siegel modular variety

References

External links

Algebraic surfaces
Complex surfaces